The 1992 Swedish Open was a men's tennis tournament played on outdoor clay courts in Båstad, Sweden that was part of the World Series of the 1992 ATP Tour. It was the 45th edition of the tournament and was held from 6 July until 12 July 1992. Second-seeded Magnus Gustafsson won his second consecutive singles title at the event.

Finals

Singles

 Magnus Gustafsson defeated  Tomás Carbonell, 5–7, 7–5, 6–4
 It was Gustafsson's 1st singles title of the year and the 4th of his career.

Doubles

 Tomás Carbonell /  Christian Miniussi defeated  Christian Bergström /  Magnus Gustafsson, 6–4, 7–5

References

External links
 ITF tournament edition details

Swedish Open
Swedish Open
Swedish Open
Swedish Open
Swed